Deogyusan National Park is located in the provinces of Jeollabuk-do and Gyeongsangnam-do, South Korea. It was designated as the 10th national park in 1975. The park is home to a total of 1,067 plant species, 32 mammal species, 130 bird species, 9 amphibian species, 13 reptile species, 28 fish species, and 1,337 insect species. Endangered animals in the park include Flying squirrel, Marten and Otter.

See also
Deogyusan

References

External links
The park's page on Korea National Park Service's website

National parks of South Korea
Protected areas established in 1984
Parks in North Jeolla Province
Parks in South Gyeongsang Province